McAdoo Township is a township in Barber County, Kansas, USA.  As of the 2000 census, its population was 29.

History
McAdoo Township was named for the McAdoo family of pioneer settlers.

Geography

The streams of East Branch South Elm Creek and West Branch South Elm Creek run through this township.

Notes

References
 USGS Geographic Names Information System (GNIS)

External links
 US-Counties.com
 City-Data.com

Townships in Barber County, Kansas
Townships in Kansas